Immaculate is the fifth studio album by Mac Mall. It was released February 27, 2001.

Track listing

 

2001 albums
Mac Mall albums